2021 Bulgarian parliamentary election may refer to:

 April 2021 Bulgarian parliamentary election
 July 2021 Bulgarian parliamentary election
 November 2021 Bulgarian parliamentary election